Tonthoingambi Leishangthem, popularly known as Tonthoi, is an Indian actress. She has established a career in Manipuri films and is the recipient of several awards, including a National Film Award.

Early life and education

She is a B. Com graduate and has taken keen interest in performing arts since very young age. Tonthoi loves sports and has actively been volunteering in social service since her childhood. She completed her master's in social work from Manipur University. As a student, she was part of the University's women football team which participated in All India Women Football tournament. She has also been trained in playing the traditional music instrument, Pena. Before joining NSD, she took a three-month acting class in the early month of 2007 under Oja Niladhaja Khuman. She has also completed her one-year residential certificate course in Theatre in Education from National School of Drama, Tripura.

Career
Leishangthem appeared in feature films, Doordarshan serials and ISTV serials.

She has also been trained in playing the traditional music instrument Pena.
She took a three-month acting class in the early month of 2007 under Oja Niladhaja Khuman. Her first film is Nangna Thawaini, where she was playing heroine's friend, alongside Kamala and Gung in a supporting role. After this, she has done a number of Manipuri films. Among the notable ones are Loibataare Ta Raju, Thoicha, Amamba Sayon (Resurrection), Eepaktuda the lake, Leipaklei, Nungshibee Kabaw Valley, Beragee Bomb, Pallepfam and Phijigee Mani.

She has also produced a Manipuri film titled Beragee Bomb under the banner of Chingkhurakpa Arts along with her brother. Her Manipuri film Pallepfam and her Assamese film Borxharanya got entries at the 10th edition of Habitat Film Festival. She also acted in an Assamese film Ishu which went on to won the National Award for Best Feature Film in Assamese 2017.

Her 2019 film Eigi Kona won the National Film Award for Best Feature Film in Manipuri at the 67th National Film Awards. She played a supporting role in the film.

Accolades
She has won a number of awards, including a National Film Award. She received the Best Supporting Actress award at the 59th National Film Awards 2011 for the film Phijigee Mani, where she played the role of Yaiphabee in the film. The citation for the award reads, "For the dignity and power with which L. T. Devi informs the character Yaipabhee in this tightly controlled Manipuri story."  Her portrayal of Nungshitombi in the movie Nangna Kappa Pakchade earned her the Best Actor in a Leading Role - Female award at the 9th Manipur State Film Awards 2014.

As of 2016, she bagged the Best Actor North-East Female at the Prag Cine Awards North-East 2016 for her performance in Oken Amakcham's Manipur film Patkee Tharo. She also won the Best Actress Award at the Prag Cine Awards - North East 2018 for her performance in the film Iche Tampha. She won the Special Jury Award for her film Iche Tampha at the 11th Manipuri State Film Awards 2018.

In 2021, she won the Grand Jury Award for Best Actor at the Chalachitram National Film Festival 2021 for her performance in the non-feature Panthougi Liklam. She won the Best Actor (Female) for her film Eewai at the Global Independent Film Festival of India, 2022 held on 30th November, 2022 at Rabindra Okakura Bhawan, Salt Lake, Kolkata, India and at Goa International Film Competition-GIFC.

Off-screen work
Tonthoi was the brand ambassador of Singju Festival, which is held every year between January and February, starting from the year 2017. Singju is a typical Manipur salad-type dish. The festival is held at different places, including MMRC and Unity Park, Khangabok and Lamdeng Makha Leikai Lampak.

Selected filmography
 Feature Films

 Non-Feature Films

References

External links
 

Indian television actresses
Best Supporting Actress National Film Award winners
21st-century Indian actresses
Living people
Meitei people
Indian film actresses
Actresses from Manipur
Actresses in Meitei cinema
Sportswomen from Manipur
1986 births
Footballers from Manipur
Association footballers not categorized by position
Association football players not categorized by nationality